This is a list of governors and colonial administrators of the Dutch East Indies.

Governors

Company appointed

Government-appointed

See also 

 Japanese occupation of the Dutch East Indies
 President of Indonesia
 List of presidents of Indonesia
 Prime Minister of Indonesia

Footnotes

Sources

External links 
 Indonesia list of authority

 
Lists of political office-holders in Indonesia
Lists of Dutch colonial governors and administrators